Kurigram-4 is a constituency represented in the Jatiya Sangsad (National Parliament) of Bangladesh since 2019 by Zakir Hossain of the Awami League.

Boundaries 
The constituency encompasses Chilmari, Char Rajibpur and Raomari upazilas.

History 
The constituency was created in 1984 from the Rangpur-17 constituency when the former Rangpur District was split into five districts: Nilphamari, Lalmonirhat, Rangpur, Kurigram, and Gaibandha.

Ahead of the 2018 general election, the Election Commission altered the boundaries of the constituency by removing one union parishad (Saheber Alga) of Ulipur Upazila, and adding the remainder of Chilmari Upazila to the two union parishads already included: Ashtamir Char and Nayerhat.

Members of Parliament

Elections

Elections in the 2010s

Elections in the 2000s

Elections in the 1990s

References

External links
 

Parliamentary constituencies in Bangladesh
Kurigram District